Kardella was a railway station on the South Gippsland line in South Gippsland, Victoria. Kardella is an Aboriginal word thought to mean possum, and was chosen by the Victorian Railways from several submissions. The station was opened in December 1891 and operated until 30 April 1976.

The station building, platform, sidings, goods storage shed, and all other rail infrastructure, were removed from the station site within months of its closure. By 1980, there was no evidence of the existence of a railway station there, apart from a gravel road alongside the rail line, near a former level crossing.

References

Disused railway stations in Victoria (Australia)
Transport in Gippsland (region)
Shire of South Gippsland